Alyssa Michele Naeher (born April 20, 1988) is an American soccer goalkeeper for the Chicago Red Stars of the National Women's Soccer League (NWSL) and the United States national team. She was on the 23-player roster for the United States at the 2015 FIFA Women's World Cup and was the starting goalkeeper for the U.S. at the 2019 FIFA Women's World Cup in France. She has also played for the Boston Breakers and Turbine Potsdam. With the Breakers, she won the 2014 NWSL Goalkeeper of the Year award.

Early life
Naeher attended Christian Heritage School, where she was a standout player in soccer. She was a three-time All-State and three-time FAA All-Conference selection. In addition to this, she was a Parade All-American and two-time NSCAA Youth All-American.  Naeher also was a star basketball player scoring over 2,000 points during her career.

Penn State University
Naeher attended Penn State from 2006 to 2009, she started 74 games during that span with a record of 50–19–5 with 24 shutouts. She was a First Team All-American in 2007 and 2008 and was named the Big 10 Defensive Player of the Year in 2007.

Club career

Boston Breakers (WPS), 2010–2011
Naeher was selected by the Boston Breakers with the 11th overall pick in the 2010 Women's Professional Soccer draft, she was the first goalkeeper selected in the 2010 WPS draft. Naeher recorded her first career shutout on August 4, 2010, against the Atlanta Beat. The Breakers finished second in the WPS standings but lost the Super Semifinal to the Philadelphia Independence.

Turbine Potsdam, 2011–2013
After the 2011 WPS season concluded, Naeher transferred to German Bundesliga club Turbine Potsdam. She appeared in 24 matches across all competitions in the 2011/2012 season for Potsdam as they won the 2011–12 Frauen-Bundesliga. Naeher returned to Potsdam for the 2012/2013 season after the 2012 WPS season was suspended.

Boston Breakers, 2013–2015
In May 2013, Naeher signed with the Boston Breakers in the newly formed National Women's Soccer League, returning to the United States after playing two years in Germany.

In the 2014 National Women's Soccer League season Naeher played every minute of the season for Boston and won the Goalkeeper of the Year award as she recorded a record 106 saves in 24 games.

On November 22, 2015, Naeher was traded from the Boston Breakers to the Chicago Red Stars for defender Whitney Engen.

Chicago Red Stars, 2015–present
Naeher had a strong start to the 2016 NWSL season in Chicago as she was named Player of the Month for May as she posted three shutouts and only allowed one goal in four games during the month.

Naeher was named Player of the Week in week 6 of the 2018 season by the NWSL Media Association, she was also named to the Team of the Month in June 2018.

On August 18, 2018, Naeher earned her 100th NWSL cap in a 2–2 draw against the Portland Thorns.

International career

Naeher was a member of the United States U-20 women's national soccer team that played at the 2007 Pan-American Games, where they finished runners-up to the full Brazilian national team.

In 2008, Naeher was the starting goalkeeper for the U-20 squad that won the 2008 FIFA U-20 Women's World Cup in Chile. She started and played in all but one game during the tournament. She only conceded one goal throughout the World Cup, which was to North Korea, during the final minutes of the championship game. She was awarded the Golden Glove Award as the best goalkeeper in the tournament.

On December 18, 2014, Naeher made her first appearance and start for the United States Women's National team in a 7–0 win over Argentina in the International Tournament of Brazil. She played the full 90 minutes and earned her first career shutout.

Naeher was on the roster for the 2015 FIFA Women's World Cup in Canada as a backup for Hope Solo, but did not play as Solo played every minute in goal as the United States won the 2015 World Cup.

In July 2016, Naeher was named to the United States Women's Soccer Team roster for the 2016 Summer Olympics in Rio, Brazil.

Since the United States' loss at the 2016 Summer Olympics, Naeher has become the USWNT's number one goalkeeper, taking over the spot that had been held by Solo for years.

Naeher was the number one goalkeeper for the United States at the 2018 CONCACAF Women's Championship; she played in four out of the five matches and earned four shutouts. The U.S won their second consecutive CONCACAF Championship with a 2–0 win over Canada.

2019 FIFA Women's World Cup
On May 2, 2019, Naeher was named to the United States roster for the 2019 World Cup; this was her second World Cup. Naeher entered the tournament as the U.S.'s number one goalkeeper. When Naeher started the team's first group game on June 11, it was the first time in over two decades that neither Hope Solo nor Briana Scurry was in goal for the U.S at a World Cup. Naeher recorded three consecutive shutouts in the group stage as the U.S won, 13–0, over Thailand, 3–0 over Chile and 2–0 against Sweden.

In the knockout round, Naeher made four saves against France in the quarterfinals to help the team preserve a 2–1 victory over the host nation. In the semifinals Naeher had three saves and stopped Steph Houghton's penalty kick in the 83rd minute to help the United States to a 2–1 victory over England. In Sunday's final, Naeher posted one save to culminate in a shutout over the Netherlands in the U.S.'s 2–0 victory, resulting in the team repeating as World Cup champions. Naeher played every minute of the United States' successful 2019 World Cup run.

2020s
Naeher won a bronze medal at the 2020 Summer Olympics. In the quarterfinal match against Netherlands, she made a penalty save in the 81st minute and two additional saves in the penalty shootout to help the team reach semifinals.

Career statistics

Club

World Cup appearances

Olympic appearances

Personal life
Naeher is the daughter of John and Donna Lynn Naeher. She has a twin sister named Amanda who played soccer for Messiah College and a younger sister named Abigail. She is of German, English, and French Canadian ancestry. Naeher is a Christian.

In popular culture

Video games
Naeher was featured along with her national teammates in the EA Sports' FIFA video game series in FIFA 16, the first time women players were included in the game.

Ticker tape parade and White House honor
Following the United States' win at the 2015 FIFA Women's World Cup, Naeher and her teammates became the first women's sports team to be honored with a ticker tape parade in New York City. Each player received a key to the city from Mayor Bill de Blasio. In October of the same year, the team was honored by President Barack Obama at the White House.

Honors
United States U20
 FIFA U20 Women's World Cup: 2008
 CONCACAF Women's U-20 Championship runner-up: 2008
United States
 FIFA Women's World Cup: 2015, 2019
 Olympic Bronze Medal: 2020
 CONCACAF Women's Championship: 2018; 2022
 CONCACAF Women's Olympic Qualifying Tournament: 2016; 2020
 SheBelieves Cup: 2016; 2018; 2020, 2021; 2022; 2023
 Tournament of Nations: 2018
Individual
NWSL Goalkeeper of the Year: 2014
NWSL Best XI: 2014
NWSL Second XI: 2016
CONCACAF Goalkeeper of the Year: 2018
CONCACAF Best XI: 2018
FIFA U-20 Women's World Cup Golden Glove: 2008
FIFA U-20 Women's World Cup All star team: 2008

See also
List of Pennsylvania State University Olympians

References

External links

Boston Breakers player profile
WPS profile
Penn State player page

1988 births
Living people
Sportspeople from Bridgeport, Connecticut
Sportspeople from New Haven County, Connecticut
Penn State Nittany Lions women's soccer players
People from Seymour, Connecticut
American women's soccer players
Boston Breakers players
Footballers at the 2007 Pan American Games
1. FFC Turbine Potsdam players
American expatriate soccer players in Germany
2015 FIFA Women's World Cup players
FIFA Women's World Cup-winning players
United States women's international soccer players
Women's association football goalkeepers
Chicago Red Stars players
National Women's Soccer League players
Pan American Games silver medalists for the United States
Footballers at the 2016 Summer Olympics
Footballers at the 2020 Summer Olympics
United States women's under-20 international soccer players
Pan American Games medalists in football
Twin sportspeople
American twins
Soccer players from Connecticut
2019 FIFA Women's World Cup players
Medalists at the 2007 Pan American Games
Olympic bronze medalists for the United States in soccer
Medalists at the 2020 Summer Olympics
American expatriate women's soccer players
Women's Professional Soccer players